Tomáš Krupčík (born January 8, 1988) is a Czech biathlete.  He competed at the 2014 Winter Olympics in Sochi, in sprint and individual.

External links
Tomas Krupcik at IBU

References

1988 births
Living people
Biathletes at the 2014 Winter Olympics
Czech male biathletes
Sportspeople from Jablonec nad Nisou
Olympic biathletes of the Czech Republic
Universiade medalists in biathlon
Universiade silver medalists for the Czech Republic
Universiade bronze medalists for the Czech Republic
Competitors at the 2013 Winter Universiade